The Longing for Less: Living with Minimalism is a nonfiction book by American writer Kyle Chayka that explores the concept of minimalism. It was published in January 2020 by Bloomsbury.

References

External links 

 The Longing for Less at Kyle Chayka's official website
 The Longing for Less at Bloomsbury

2020 non-fiction books
Minimalism
Bloomsbury Publishing books